Mequéns River may refer to:

 Mequéns River (Guaporé River)
 Mequéns River (São João River)